Jan Syczewski (26 March 1937 – 9 March 2023) was a Polish teacher and politician of the Belarusian minority. A member of the Democratic Left Alliance, he served in the Sejm from 1997 to 2001.

Syczewski died on 9 March 2023, at the age of 85.

References

1937 births
2023 deaths
Polish people of Belarusian descent
Polish United Workers' Party members
Democratic Left Alliance politicians
Members of the Polish Sejm 1997–2001
University of Gdańsk alumni
Academic staff of Bialystok University of Technology
Commanders of the Order of Polonia Restituta
Recipients of the Order of Francysk Skaryna
People from Bielsk County